In ancient Roman religion, Sancus (also known as Sangus or Semo Sancus) was a god of trust, honesty, and oaths. His cult, one of the most ancient amongst the Romans, probably derived from Umbrian influences. Cato and Silius Italicus wrote that Sancus was a Sabine god and father of the eponymous Sabine hero Sabus. He is thus sometimes considered a founder-deity.

Oaths
Sancus was the god who protected oaths of marriage, hospitality, law, commerce, and particularly formal contracts. Some of the oaths said at the moment of signing a contract – or other important civil promissory acts – named Sancus as guarantor, and called on him to protect and guard over the honour and integrity of the signatories' pledges.

Etymology
The place-name  is related to the theonym, through the proper name .

Sancus derives from a Latin/Umbrian/Sabine source (compare Umbrian sacra/ sakra "sacred", and the Umbrian theonym Sansi/Saçi), and is connected to Latin  ('to hallow') and hence sanctus ('hallowed') and English saint, sacred, sanctuary, sanctity and sanction.

Outside Italic, Hittite has a number of words such as saklai "rites" and sankunnis "priest" that seem to be clear cognates, suggesting an Indo-European root *sank-/*sak- "to sanctify". It is possible, however, that the former was a loan from Akkadian sakku(m) 'cultic rites,' and the latter may be a loan word from Sumerian sanga "administrative priest".

Woodard has  interpreted Sancus as the Roman equivalent of Vedic god Indra (whose name is likely related to Sanskrit indu "rain drop"), who has to rely on the help of the Maruts, in his view corresponding to the twelfth Roman  of the carmen Arvale, in his task of killing the dragon Vrtra thus freeing the waters and averting draught. He traces the etymology of Semo to PIE stem root * bearing the meanings of 'to pour', 'ladle', 'flow', 'drop' related to rain and sowing. (See more below at "Mars and Semo")

Worship
The temple dedicated to Sancus stood on the Quirinal Hill, under the name .

Dionysius of Halicarnassus writes that the worship of Semo Sancus was imported into Rome at a very early time by the Sabines who occupied the Quirinal Hill. According to tradition his cult was said to have been introduced by the Sabines and perhaps king Titus Tatius dedicated a small shrine. The actual construction of the temple is generally ascribed to Lucius Tarquinius Superbus, although it was dedicated by Spurius Postumius on 5 June 466 BCE.

Sancus was considered the son of Jupiter, an opinion recorded by Varro and attributed to his teacher Aelius Stilo. He was the god of heavenly light, the avenger of dishonesty, the upholder of truth and good faith, the sanctifier of agreements. Hence his identification with Hercules, who was likewise the guardian of the sanctity of oaths.

Shrine on Quirinal
The shrine on the Quirinal was described by 19th century archeologist R.A. Lanciani. It was described by classical writers as having no roof so as oaths could be taken under the sky.

It had a chapel containing relics of the regal period: A bronze statue of Tanaquil or Gaia Caecilia, her belt containing remedies that people came to collect, her distaff, spindle, and slippers, and after the capture of Privernum in 329 BCE, brass medallions or bronze wheels (discs) made of the money confiscated from Vitruvius Vaccus.

Dionysius of Halicarnassus records that the treaty between Rome and Gabii was preserved in this temple. This treaty was perhaps the first international treaty to be recorded and preserved in written form in ancient Rome. It was written on the skin of the ox sacrificed to the god upon its agreement and fixed onto a wooden frame or a  shield.

According to Lanciani the foundations of the temple were discovered in March 1881, under what was formerly the convent of San Silvestro al Quirinale (or ), later the headquarters of the (former) Royal Engineers. Lanciani relates the monument was a parallelogram in shape, thirty-five feet long by nineteen wide, with walls of travertine and decorations in white marble. It was surrounded by votive altars and the pedestal of statues. In Latin literature it is sometimes called aedes, sometimes sacellum, this last appellation probably connected to the fact it was a sacred space in the open air. Platner & Ashby (1929) though write that its foundations had already been detected in the 16th century.

Lanciani supposes the statue depicted in this article might have been found on the site of the shrine on the Quirinal as it appeared in the antiquarian market of Rome at the time of the excavations at San Silvestro.

Statue and shrine on Tiber Island and others
Semo Sancus had a large sanctuary at Velitrae, now Velletri, in Volscian territory.

This altar bears the inscription seen and misread by Justin ( read as ) and was discovered on the island in July 1574. Lanciani advances the hypothesis that while the shrine on the Quirinal was of Sabine origin that on the Tiber island was Latin.
Claridge (1998) reports that the statue of Sancus (inscribed ) was found on the Tiber Island.

The statue is life-sized and is of the archaic Apollo (kouros) type. The expression of the face and the modeling of the body however are realistic. Both hands are missing, so that it is impossible to say what were the attributes of the god, one being perhaps the club of Hercules and/or the ossifrage, the augural bird proper to the god, hypotheses made by archaeologist Visconti and reported by Lanciani. Other scholars think he should have held lightning bolts in his left hand.

Lanciani makes reference to a glossa of Sextus Pompeius Festus s.v.  which states these were small shrines of lesser divinities, to whom , i.e. lambs two years old, were sacrificed.

– priests of Semo Sancus
For this reason the priests of Semo Sancus were called .

Their residence at the shrine on the Quirinal was located adjoining the chapel: it was ample and commodious, provided with a supply of water by means of a lead pipe.
The pipes have been removed to the Capitoline Museum. They bear the same inscription found on the base of the statue.
The foundations of the shrine on the Quirinal were destroyed.

Simon Magus
Justin Martyr records that Simon Magus, a gnostic mentioned in the Christian Bible, performed such miracles by magic acts during the reign of Claudius that he was regarded as a god and honored with a statue on the island in the Tiber which the two bridges cross, with the inscription , 'to Simon the Holy God'.
However, in 1574, the Semo Sancus statue was unearthed on the island in question, leading most scholars to believe that Justin confused  with Simon Magus.

Origins and significance

Even in the ancient world, confusion surrounded this deity, as evidenced by the multiple and unstable forms of his name. Aelius Stilo
identified him with Hercules, and explained also that because the god was called by the Romans "Dius Fidius", he was a son of Jove by interpreting the expression Dius Fidius as Diovis Filius (son of Jove); and in order to further clarify the notion of Semo Sancus as a son of Jupiter, he explained the meaning of the expression "Diovis Filius" meaning "son of Jove" by comparing it as an example to the Greek word "Dioskouros" applied to Castor; and claimed that just as the Greeks call for example Castor a "Dioskouros" i.e. a "young boy" or "son" (kouros) of Zeus (Dios); the same way the Romans called Sancus a "Diovis Filius" - a "son of Jove". In late antiquity, Martianus Capella places Sancus in region 12 of his cosmological system, which draws on Etruscan tradition in associating gods with specific parts of the sky.
On the Piacenza Liver the corresponding case bears the theonym Tluscv.
The complexity of the theonym and the multiple relationships of the god with other divine figures shall be better examined in a systematic wise here below.

Sancus as 

In Rome this theonym is attested in the carmen Arvale (semunis alternei advocapit conctos repeated thrice) and in two fragmentary inscriptions: CIL V 567 Semoni Sanco Deo Fidio ... decur(ia) bidentalis donum dedit and CIL V 568 Sanco Sancto Semoni Deo Fidio sacrum decuria sacerdotum bidentalium

Their interpretation remains obscure: an etymological and semantic relation to PIE root , meaning 'growth', is possible though problematic and debated, since that root also means "horn, head" which would suggest a horned deity.

Also in Umbrian, in the Iguvine Tables, the b side of tablet II begins "seminies tekuries" which is interpreted to be a "decurial [festival] to Semo..." where a pig and goat sacrifice were performed, though the opening lines of this tablet are difficult to translate with certainty.

entities that belong to the intermediate sphere between gods and men.
The  would then be a class of semigods, i.e. people who did not share the destiny of ordinary mortals even though they were not admitted to Heaven, such as Faunus, Priapus, Picus, the Silvani.
Dahrenberg & Saglio Dictionnaire des Antiquites Grecques et Romaines s.v. Semo Sancus.
</ref>

Only thereafter could the head and property of the culprit be vowed to the appropriate god. That Semo Sancus received the same kind of cult and sacrifice is shown in the inscription (see figure in this article) now under the statue of the god reading .

It has also been proposed to understand this relationship in the light of that between Vedic god Indra or his companion Trita Āpya and the Maruts.
Norden (1939) proposed a Greek origin.

Sancus and Salus
The two gods were related in several ways.
These deities were connected to the ancient agrarian cults of the valley of the Circus Maximus that remain quite mysterious.

The statue of Tanaquil placed in the shrine of Sancus was famed for containing remedies in its girdle which people came to collect, named .

There is consensus among scholars that this line is a later addition and cannot be dated with certainty.
In other inscriptions Salus is never connected to Semonia.

Sancus Dius Fidius and Jupiter
The relationship between the two gods is certain as both are in charge of oath, are connected with clear daylight sky and can wield lightning bolts. This overlap of functional characters has generated confusion about the identity of Sancus Dius Fidius either among ancient and modern scholars, as Dius Fidius has sometimes been considered another theonym for Iupiter.
Sabine Clausus of Latin Claudius. But Sansi/Saçi also occurs with Iupater, as well as alone, and with the Umbrian theonyms Fisovius and Vesticius.The fact that Sancus as Iupiter is in charge of the observance of oaths, of the laws of hospitality and of loyalty (Fides) makes him a deity connected with the sphere and values of sovereignty, i.e. what Dumézil calls "the first function".

Wissowa (1909, 1912) advanced the hypothesis that Semo Sancus is the 'genius' of Jupiter. Fowler (1899) cautioned that this interpretation looks to be an anachronism, and it would only be acceptable to say that Sancus is a Genius Iovius, as it appears from the Iguvine Tables; the concept of a genius of a deity is attested only in the imperial period.

In their view Sancus would be a deity who was shared by all ancient Italic peoples, whether Osco-Umbrian or Latino-Faliscan.

The details of the cult of Fisus Sancius at Iguvium and those of Fides at Rome,
confirm the parallelism.

Supporting this interpretation is the explanation of the theonym Sancus as meaning sky in Sabine given by Johannes Lydus, etymology that however is rejected by Dumézil and Briquel among others. The claim is also contradicted by the fact that the first element of Ju-piter goes back to [Proto-Indo-European] *diēu- "bright (sky)," and that the cognate Indo-European deities of Jupiter (such as Old Norse Tyr) are also connected with oath keeping.

These values are all proper to sovereign gods and common with Iuppiter (and with Mitra in Vedic religion).

Sancus and Hercules
Stilo's interpretation in its linguistic aspect looks to be unsupported by the form of the theonym in the Iguvine Tables, where it appears as Fisus or Fisovius Sancius, a formula that includes the two component parts of the theonym.
This theonym is rooted in an ancient IE * and is formed on the root stem * which is common to Latin .

The connexion to Hercules looks to be much more substantial on theological grounds. Hercules, especially in ancient Italy, retained many archaic features of a founder deity and of a guarantor of good faith and loyalty. The relationship with Jupiter of the two characters could be considered analogous. Hence both some ancient scholars such as Varro and Macrobius and modern ones as Woodard (2006) consider them as one.

Sancus and Mars
This might be explained by the military nature of the concept of sanction which implies the use of repression.

The martial aspect of Sancus is highlighted also in the instance of the Samnite , a selected part of the army formed by noble soldiers bound by a set of particularly compelling oaths and put under the special protection of Iupiter. While ordinary soldiers dressed in a purple red paludamentum with golden paraphernalia, those of the  dressed in white with silver paraphernalia, as an apparent show of their different allegiance and protector. This strict association of the ritual to Iupiter underlines the military aspect of the sovereign god that comes in to supplement the usual role of Mars on special occasions, i.e. when there is the need for the support of his power.

A prodigy related by Livy concerning an  who broke a rainstone or meteorite fallen into a grove sacred to Mars at Crustumerium in 177 BCE has also been seen by some scholars as a sign of a martial aspect of Sancus. Woodard has  interpreted Sancus as the Roman equivalent of Vedic god Indra, who has to rely on the help of the Maruts, in his view corresponding to the twelfth Roman  of the carmen Arvale, in his task of killing the dragon Vrtra thus freeing the waters and averting draught. He traces the etymology of Semo to PIE root * bearing the meanings of 'to pour', 'ladle', 'flow', 'drop' related to rain and sowing.
 In Roman myth Hercules would represent this mythic character in his killing of the monster Cacus. Sancus would be identical to Hercules and strictly related, though not identical, to Mars as purported by the old cults of the Salii of Tibur related by Varro and other ancient authors cited by Macrobius. The tricephalous deity represented near Hercules in Etruscan tombs and reflected in the wise of the killing of Cacus would correspond to the features of the monster killed by Indra in association with Trita Āpya.

The connection between Sancus and Mars can be further explained by the fact that Semo Sancus could be considered identical with the god Enyalius son of Mars (Ares); but sometimes Enyalius served also as an epithet of Ares (Mars) himself thus the two came to be regarded as very similar in character and their identities could overlap at times. Pirro Ligorio in the Codice Torinese'' reports the tradition about this god (Sancus) as found in the city of Rieti, populated by the Sabines and he writes as such: "[…] Hoggidì questa città chiamano Rieti, et delle sue antichità si trova questa base rotonda nel mezzo della sua piazza, sopra la quale fu già la statua di Sancte Sabinorum che è il Genio detto Sango et alcuni il chiamano Genio altri Enialio figliuolo di Marte, alcuni vogliono che sia Hercole, altri Apolline […]" which translates as: "Nowadays they call this city Rieti, and of its ancient artifacts this rounded base can be found in the center of its square, on top of which there was the statue of Sancte Sabinorum who is the Genius called Sangus and some call him Genius others Enyalios son of Mars, some claim he is Hercules, others Apollo […]".

Sancus in Etruria
As for Etruscan religion, N. Thomas De Grummond has suggested to identify Sancus in the inscription  found on a  unearthed near Bolsena; however, other scholars connect this epithet to a local family .

Footnotes

References

External links
 
 Ancient Library article

Roman gods
Commerce gods